Shoemake Nunatak is a nunatak immediately west of Billey Bluff at the southwest end of the Ickes Mountains, coastal Marie Byrd Land. The nunatak was photographed from aircraft of the United States Antarctic Service (USAS), 1939–41, and was mapped by the United States Geological Survey (USGS) from surveys and U.S. Navy aerial photography, 1959–65. Named by Advisory Committee on Antarctic Names (US-ACAN) for John L. Shoemake, aerographer, U.S. Navy, weather observer at Brockton Station on the Ross Ice Shelf during two summer seasons, 1968–69 and 1969–70.

Nunataks of Marie Byrd Land